Because of Anya is a children's novel by Margaret Peterson Haddix first published on November 1, 2002. The novel is about a ten-year-old girl with alopecia areata, her difficulties in school, and the importance of friendship.

References

2002 American novels
American children's novels
Novels set in elementary and primary schools
2002 children's books
Novels by Margaret Peterson Haddix